Interlibrary loan (abbreviated ILL, and sometimes called document delivery, document supply, interlending, interlibrary services, interloan, or resource sharing) is a service that enables patrons of one library to borrow physical materials and receive electronic documents that are held by another library. The service expands library patrons' access to resources beyond their local library's holdings, serving as "an integral element of collection development" for libraries.

Procedures and methods

After receiving a request from their patron, the borrowing library identifies potential lending libraries with the desired item. The lending library then delivers the item physically or electronically, and the borrowing library receives the item, delivers it to their patron, and if necessary, arranges for its return. In some cases, fees accompany interlibrary loan services. While the majority of interlibrary loan requests are now managed through semi-automated electronic systems, libraries can also submit requests by postal mail, fax, email, or telephone call, referred to as manual requests. Manual requests can be submitted in the United States through the American Library Association. 

Interlibrary loan and resource sharing have a variety of systems and workflows, which vary based on a library's scale of service, regional networks, and library management systems. Processes are automated by electronic systems, including VDX, Tipasa, ILLiad, Ex Libris Rapido, and OCLC Worldshare Management System.

In the early 1990s, the Research Libraries Group released Ariel, a software that made communicating both photocopies and native digital articles more efficient. In the early 2000s, Atlas Systems, creators of ILLiad, launched Odyssey, which allowed for direct communication of digital files between libraries, and ultimately direct sending of digital materials to library patrons. OCLC created Article Exchange, a cloud-based article sharing platform that automatically deletes materials after a specified number of downloads and/or a number of days.

With multiple interlibrary loan systems in use, the International Organization for Standardization (ISO) developed ISO standards 10160 and 10161 to standardize terminology and define a set of communication protocols between various interlibrary loan systems, allowing for interoperability across platforms.

Libraries can define what materials from their holdings are eligible for interlibrary loan. Many journal or database licenses specify whether a library can or cannot supply journal articles via ILL, with libraries negotiating for ILL eligibility. With increasing demand for digital materials, libraries have begun exploring the legal, technical, and licensing aspects of lending and borrowing ebooks through interlibrary loan.

History
Informal borrowing and lending between libraries has a long history, with examples in Western Europe as early as the 8th century CE. In the 16th century, Nicolas Claude Fabri de Peiresc unsuccessfully attempted to establish an interlibrary loan system between the Royal Library at the Louvre Palace in Paris and the Vatican Library in Rome.

In 1876, Massachusetts librarian Samuel Swett Green published a proposal for an interlibrary loan system modeled on European examples, writing, "It would add greatly to the usefulness of our reference libraries if an agreement should be made to lend books to each other for short periods of time."

In 1886, Joseph C. Rowell, librarian at the University of California, Berkeley, sought permission to begin an interlibrary loan program. In 1894, Rowell initiated U.C. Berkeley's first program of interlibrary lending with the California State Library. In 1917, the American Library Association established a national code for interlibrary loan in the United States.

In China, formalized interlibrary loan policies were established as early as 1924 through the Shanghai Library Constitution.

In 1927, an increase in international lending and borrowing between libraries  following the First World War led to the establishment of the International Federation of Library Associations and Institutions (IFLA). IFLA would go on to publish the "International Resource Sharing and Document Delivery: Principles and Guidelines for Procedure" in 1954. These guidelines, which saw major revisions in 1978 and 2001, provided recommendations for countries to develop national policies for international resource sharing and document delivery across the globe.

In Great Britain, Kate Edith Pierce became the chair of the newly formed East Midlands Regional Library Bureau in 1935. Enabled by Carnegie Trust funding, the Bureau introduced formalized "Inter-Library Lending" to the region for the first time.

The Ohio State University and others in Ohio began integrating campus library systems at an early date. In the 1960s, state funds supported development of the Ohio College Library Center (now the Online Computer Library Center). OCLC has since grown into an international organization with a database of 30 million entries representing materials held in more than 10,000 libraries.

In 1994, the Reference and User Services Association (RUSA) of the ALA (America Library Association) formed an ALA Interlibrary Loan Code for the United States, which sought to establish resource sharing as a core service and to provide guidelines for libraries. The RUSA section on Resource Sharing has also engaged in initiatives to expand resource sharing, including the Rethinking Resource Sharing Initiative and Committee.

In 1997, following a flash flood that significantly damaged its physical journal holdings, Colorado State University developed RapidILL as a resource sharing solution for expedited article delivery. The service has since grown to include over 300 member libraries internationally, with most member libraries concentrated in the United States. Recent expansions of the service include RapidR, which supports the lending of returnables such as physical books. In 2019, Ex Libris acquired RapidILL from CSU.

Resource sharing networks

Libraries have established voluntary associations for resource sharing, organized on a regional or national basis, or through other affiliations such as university systems with multiple campuses, communities of libraries with related holdings and research interests, or established library consortia.

Resource sharing networks can provide an online union catalog of all items held by member libraries to facilitate interlibrary loan transactions. These networks also can provide the benefit of reduced fees, expedited turnaround times for requests, interoperable automated systems, or shared courier services for physical items.

The International Federation of Library Associations and Institutions (IFLA) guides interlibrary loan policies internationally. Because financial transactions between libraries in different countries can at times prove difficult, IFLA developed the International Interlibrary Voucher Scheme. Libraries can exchange "IFLA vouchers" in lieu of physical cash or electronic payments for interlibrary loan requests.

North America 
In the U.S., OCLC is used by public and academic libraries. Formerly, another network RLIN (Research Libraries Information Network) was used primarily by academic libraries but merged with OCLC on October 1, 2007. The Center for Research Libraries is a major resource sharing network in North America with a buy-in membership system. Other large resource sharing networks include Libraries Very Interested in Sharing (LVIS) and Amigos, which offers members its Trans-Amigos Express courier network.

Medical libraries in the United States participate in the National Network of Libraries of Medicine to share resources. The National Library of Medicine developed the request routing system DOCLINE for this purpose.

Northeast 

 Boston Library Consortium
 Minuteman Library Network
 Partnership for Academic Library Collaboration and Innovation (PALCI), formerly the Pennsylvania Academic Library Consortium
 Washington Research Library Consortium

Midwest 

 Mid-America Association of Law Libraries (MAALL)
 OhioLINK, the system used in Ohio, where the catalogs and databases of state libraries are joined electronically.

South 

 Florida Library Information Network
 TexShare, the statewide resource sharing network of Texas

West 

 Bibliographical Center for Research
 Washington County Cooperative Library Services
 Whatcom County Library System
 Link+, an interlibrary loan scheme in California and Nevada
 Greater Western Library Alliance

Africa 
The South Africa South African Bibliographic and Information Network (SABINET) was developed in 1983 for the purposes of collection development and resource sharing across libraries in South Africa.

In Ghana, the Ghana Inter-Library Lending and Document Delivery Network (GILLDDNET) pioneered resource sharing in West Africa. The network was replaced in 2004 by the Consortium of Academic and Research Libraries (CARLIGH).

Central and South America 
Consorcio Iberoamericano para la Educación en Ciencia y Tecnología (ISTEC) is a consortium and resource sharing network of 50 institutions across 17 countries in Latin America and the Iberian Penninsula, with a focus on sharing science and technology materials. Many ISTEC member libraries use the ILL software Celsius, which was developed as part of the consortium initiative.

Consorcio de Bibliotecas Universitarias de El Salvador (CBUES) is a resource sharing consortium of institutions on the Atlantic coast, including libraries from Costa Rica, Nicaragua, Mexico and Panama.

Europe 
In France, the PEB interlibrary loan network services over 300 libraries using the SUPEB ILL software.

In Germany, Gateway Bayern is the interlibrary loan network and tool for Bavarian libraries, including the Bavarian State Library.

Asia 
DELNET, the Developing Library Network (formerly the Delhi Library Network), is a large resource sharing network connecting more than 7,700 institutions across India and South Asia.

The National Diet Library of Japan serves as a resource sharing hub for Japanese-language materials domestically and internationally.

Launched in 2000, China Academic Library and Information System (CALIS) is a Beijing-based academic library consortium that facilitates interlibrary loan among research libraries in China.

Oceania 
Australia uses Libraries Australia, and New Zealand utilizes the New Zealand Libraries' Catalogue.

References

Further reading
 Boucher, Virginia. Interlibrary Loan Practices Handbook, 2nd Edition; American Library Association, Chicago and London, 1997
 
 
 Newcombe, Luxmoore. Library Co-operation in the British Isles, in series, Practical Library Handbooks, no. 4. London: G. Allen & Unwin, 1937.
 2008 Document Delivery - Best Practices and Vendor Scorecard—Outsell, Inc.
 Journal of Library Administration; Volume 23, Numbers 1/2, 1996

External links
 ALA Interlibrary Loan Form
 SHAREit by Auto-Graphics
 Commercial document delivery vendors
 Interlibrary Loan Application Standards Maintenance Agency
 OCLC Resource Sharing

Library circulation
Library cooperation